Leather is a surname. Notable people with the surname include:

 Diane Leather (1933–2018), English athlete and first woman to run a sub-5-minute mile
 Edwin Leather, conservative politician in the United Kingdom, and Governor of Bermuda
 Ella Mary Leather, folklorist
 Roland Leather, British cricketer for Yorkshire County Cricket Club
 Stephen Leather, English  author of thrillers
 Suzi Leather, British member of the Labour Party

Fictional characters:
 Bret Leather, character appearing in Planetary

See also
 Blanche Douglass Leathers (1860-1940), American steamboat pilot
 Frederick Leathers, 1st Viscount Leathers, British industrialist and public servant